The 2005 Asian Junior Badminton Championships is an Asia continental junior championships to crown the best U-19 badminton players across Asia. This tournament were held in Tennis Indoor Senayan, Gelora Bung Karno Sports Complex, Jakarta, Indonesia from 11–17 July. In the team event, South Korean boys', and the Chinese girls' team won the gold medal respectively. In the individual event, China won three gold medal in the boys' singles, girls' singles and girls' doubles event, while South Korea won two gold medal in the boys' and mixed doubles.

Medalists

Results

Semifinals

Finals

Medal table

References

External links
 badmintoncentral.com
 Results at www.badminton.or.jp
 Individual semi-finals and finals results at www.cba.org.cn

Badminton Asia Junior Championships
Asian Junior Badminton Championships
Asian Junior Badminton Championships
International sports competitions hosted by Indonesia
2005 in youth sport